Cyclin-dependent kinase 4 inhibitor B also known as multiple tumor suppressor 2 (MTS-2) or p15INK4b is a protein that is encoded by the CDKN2B gene in humans.

Function 

This gene lies adjacent to the tumor suppressor gene CDKN2A in a region that is frequently mutated, deleted, or disregulated in a wide variety of cancer. This gene encodes a cyclin-dependent kinase inhibitor, also known as p15Ink4b protein, which forms a complex with CDK4 or CDK6, and prevents the activation of the CDK kinases by cyclin D, thus the encoded protein functions as a cell growth regulator that inhibits cell cycle G1 progression. The expression of this gene was found to be dramatically induced by TGF beta, which suggested its role in the TGF beta induced growth inhibition. Two alternatively spliced transcripts of this gene encode proteins that share the N-terminal sequence but completely differ in the C-terminus.

Interactions 

CDKN2B tumor suppressor gene product p15 has been shown to interact with cyclin-dependent kinase 4.

References

Further reading

External links